The 2002 South American Rugby Championship was the 24th edition of the competition of the leading national Rugby Union teams in South America.

The tournament was played in Mendoza and Santiago, with four teams participating.

Argentina won the tournament.

Standings 

 Three points for victory, two for a draw, and one for a loss 
{| class="wikitable"
|-
!width=165|Team
!width=40|Played
!width=40|Won
!width=40|Drawn
!width=40|Lost
!width=40|For
!width=40|Against
!width=40|Difference
!width=40|Pts
|- bgcolor=#ccffcc align=center
|align=left| 
|3||3||0||0||244||34||+ 210||9
|- align=center
|align=left| 
|3||2||0||1||135||59||+ 76||7
|- align=center
|align=left| 
|3||1||0||2||86||95||- 9||5
|- align=center
|align=left| 
|3||0||0||3||13||290||- 277||3
|}

Results

References

2002
2002 rugby union tournaments for national teams
A
2002 in Argentine rugby union
rugby union
rugby union
rugby union
International rugby union competitions hosted by Argentina
International rugby union competitions hosted by Chile